Indian Springs Hotel Museum is located in the former Indian Springs Hotel, a historic hotel in Georgia established in 1825. The Treaty of 1825 was signed at the hotel; the Creek Indians ceded much of Georgia and Alabama to the United States in the treaty. During the American Civil War, Sherman's troops camped in the area. It is listed on the National Register of Historic Places. It has been restored and converted into a museum.

See also
National Register of Historic Places listings in Butts County, Georgia

References

External links
 Indian Springs Hotel Museum - The Village at Indian Springs

Hotel buildings completed in 1825
Hotel buildings on the National Register of Historic Places in Georgia (U.S. state)
Museums in Butts County, Georgia
History museums in Georgia (U.S. state)
1825 establishments in Georgia (U.S. state)
National Register of Historic Places in Butts County, Georgia